Tibor Máté (born December 14, 1914, date of death unknown) was a Hungarian field handball player who competed in the 1936 Summer Olympics. He was part of the Hungarian field handball team, which finished fourth in the Olympic tournament. He played two matches as goalkeeper.

References
Tibor Máté's profile at the Hungarian Olympic Committee 

1914 births
Year of death missing
Field handball players at the 1936 Summer Olympics
Hungarian male handball players
Olympic handball players of Hungary